Thunder Bay is a 1953 American adventure film distributed by Universal International, produced by Aaron Rosenberg, directed by Anthony Mann, and starring James Stewart, Joanne Dru, Gilbert Roland, and Dan Duryea. It was shot in Technicolor and was released on May 20, 1953. This film tells the story of two engineers drilling for oil in the Louisiana gulf while dealing with hostility of the local shrimp fishermen fearing for their livelihood, and features the first non-western collaboration between Stewart and Mann.

Plot
Penniless but full of ideas, Steve Martin (James Stewart) and Johnny Gambi (Dan Duryea), engineers who served in the Navy during World War II, walk down a quiet road on the gulf coast of Louisiana. Teche Bossier (Gilbert Roland), owner of the Port Felicity Fish Co., agrees to drive them into the shrimping town Port Felicity for five dollars. On reaching their destination, Gambi rents a shrimp boat from Dominique Rigaud (Antonio Moreno), although the fisherman's daughter Stella  (Joanne Dru ) distrusts them immediately.

Gambi and Steve use the boat to show potential investor Kermit MacDonough (Jay C. Flippen) the location in which they plan to drill for offshore oil. Claiming that he has designed a drilling platform that can withstand any storm, Steve estimates that by investing one million dollars now they will soon tap an oil reserve worth two billion. His enthusiasm is so infectious that MacDonough agrees to fund the project, against the advice of his secretary, Rawlins. However, MacDonough warns Steve that he must discover oil within three months, or his company, due to huge investments made in an offshore oil lease, will put them both out of work.

Several weeks later, Gambi meets and falls for Stella's younger sister Francesca,, but, according to custom, she has been betrothed since childhood to Philippe Bayard. After singing a love song in the local gathering place Bon Chance, Philippe is upset to see Francesca enter with Gambi. Teche, who good-naturedly calls the oilmen "foreigners," agrees to help Steve and Gambi, but Stella refuses to accept Steve's statement that oil will be good for the town, claiming that she learned about "their kind" during her stay in Chicago. Nevertheless, the outsiders hire a crew and begin their search for oil.

When Teche sees dynamite charges being dropped into the gulf, he begs them to stop, believing that the explosions will kill the shrimp and worsen an already dismal shrimping season. Steve maintains that the charges are safe, but Teche returns to town and incites the fishermen to form an angry mob. Steve manages to scare the mob away by exploding sticks of dynamite behind them, and he placates Stella by warning Gambi to stay away from Francesca. Steve gently advises Francesca to "go back to [her] people."

With one month gone, Steve drives the building crew relentlessly, and the platform and rig are completed on schedule. He immediately orders the drilling crew to get started, and the exhausted Gambi is relieved when a hurricane warning gives the men an excuse to take the night off. Gambi and his men enter the Bon Chance with Francesca, and Philippe furiously punches his rival and starts a brawl. The sheriff arrests the oilmen and Francesca angrily denounces all the men.

During the storm Stella visits Steve at the rig, determined to have Gambi fired so that he stops seeing her sister. Steve explains to Stella that, if he could pull up a resource that has been in the earth for millions of years, then he will truly have accomplished something. Stella finally abandons her suspicion and kisses Steve, but back in town Philippe persuades Teche to help him destroy the oil rig. With the hurricane winds rising, Philippe climbs onto the platform and lights a bundle of dynamite, but Steve sees him and the two men fight. Philippe trips and disappears under the waves, and Steve, horrified, assumes that Stella was involved in Philippe's plot.

The rig survives the storm, and in the morning drilling begins. However, eight days before the deadline, MacDonough visits Steve and sadly delivers the news that the board of his company has voted to stop the drilling operation the following day, fearing a penalty for non-payment on their lease. MacDonough has already spent all of his own money, and the crew is unable to work for no pay. Gambi soon returns from town, announcing that he has just married Francesca. Steve punches Gambi, who in reply  loudly chastises Steve for having driven him and the men too hard. Steve orders them all to leave, intending to do the drilling himself, whereupon Gambi hesitates and then persuades the crew to remain. While the men are drilling, they discover that the troublesome shrimp that have been clogging the valves are actually the huge golden shrimp that have so long eluded the local fishermen.

Steve later takes Francesca to the rig, infuriating Dominique, who inflames the fishermen by declaring that the oilmen will steal their daughters and destroy the town. At Stella's request, Teche go to warn Steve about the impending mob on its way to the rig. There, Steve feigns ignorance about the golden shrimp and asks Teche if he can help him get rid of the creatures. He then addresses the furious mob to assure the men on their concerns: Francesca's marriage is a happy one and, moreover, oil will bring progress and prosperity to Port Felicity. Despite these words the mob decides to destroy the structure, but at that moment oil explodes through the rig and onto the platform. Later,  the fishermen discover that the golden shrimp bed is huge, and consequently the conflict between the oilmen and the fishermen is resolved. Teche then convinces Steve that Stella was not involved in Philippe's plot and the lovers finally come together.

Cast
 James Stewart as Steve Martin
 Joanne Dru as Stella Rigaud
 Gilbert Roland as Teche Bossier
 Dan Duryea as Johnny Gambi
 Jay C. Flippen as Kermit MacDonald
 Marcia Henderson as Francesca Rigaud
 Robert Monet as Phillipe Bayard
 Antonio Moreno as Dominique Rigaud
 Harry Morgan as Rawlings, MacDonald's assistant (as Henry Morgan)
 Fortunio Bonanova as Sheriff Antoine Chighizola
 Mario Siletti as Louis Chighizola

Production
Production for this film started from late September to mid-November 1952. It was filmed in 1.37:1 full frame aspect ratio while it was released in 1.85:1 anamorphic widescreen.

The film was Universal-International's first with stereophonic sound. It was also originally planned to be photographed in 3-D, but those plans were scrapped sometime during production.

The film was shot in Morgan City, Louisiana with some scenes shot in New Orleans and on an oil-drilling barge in the Gulf of Mexico. While filming the scenes on-location in Louisiana, Dan Duryea slipped and fell from the roof of a tugboat (which appears throughout the film). He suffered a broken rib, contusion, and bruises but was able to continue filming after a day or two of rest.

Release
The film premiered at Loew's State Theatre in New York City on Tuesday, May 19, 1953 demonstrating Universal-International's widescreen process and stereophonic sound. It began its release the following day.

Reception
The film received favourable reviews although some complained that the sound from the film's stereophonic presentation, with its use of three speakers, was loud and distracting.

It opened with a gross of $42,000, the best opening for a Universal film at Loew's State.

Home media
Universal first released this film on VHS on March 1, 1992. Then, on June 12, 2007, it was released on DVD as part of the James Stewart Screen Legend Collection, a 3-disc set featuring four other films (Next Time We Love, You Gotta Stay Happy, The Glenn Miller Story, and Shenandoah). This film was re-released on August 30, 2013 as a stand-alone DVD as part of the Universal Vault Series. (The DVD releases of the movie are not presented in the film's original 1.33:1 aspect ratio.)

References

External links 

 
 
 
 
 
 Thunder Bay at Dan Duryea Central

1953 films
1950s adventure drama films
American adventure drama films
1950s English-language films
Films directed by Anthony Mann
Films set in Louisiana
Films shot in Louisiana
Universal Pictures films
Works about petroleum
Films scored by Frank Skinner
1953 drama films
1950s American films